The Testament of Aga Koppanyi is a 1967 Hungarian adventure film based on the eponymous novel by István Fekete.

Cast 
 Péter Benkő as László Babocsai
 Klári Tolnay as Sára Babocsai
 Ferenc Bessenyei as captain Csomai
 Gyula Benkő as Gáspár Babocsai
 Ádám Szirtes as Márkó Bogics
 Gyula Bodrogi as Jóska
 István Iglódi as Miklós

References

External links 

1967 adventure films
1967 films
Hungarian drama films
Films set in Lake Balaton
Films directed by Éva Zsurzs